Gumelemi Cay is a tiny island directly north of the Baker's Bay tip of Great Guana Cay in The Bahamas.  The island is a sea turtle nesting ground.  Loggerhead sea turtles, hawksbill sea turtles and green sea turtles nest on the  island.  

Baker's Bay Golf & Ocean Club, which owns the island and the  adjacent to it, plans to develop the acreage into six lots, despite opposition from Jean-Michel Cousteau's Ocean Futures Society, Caribbean Conservation Corps and the Archie Carr Center.

References

Abaco Islands